The Alys Robinson Stephens Performing Arts Center (ASC) is a performing arts facility located on the campus of the University of Alabama at Birmingham (UAB).  It hosts over 250,000 people for more than 300 diverse events annually. The ASC is the center for entertainment and arts education in Birmingham and Central Alabama. The  facility houses four performance venues, including the 1,330-seat Jemison Concert Hall, the 350-seat Sirote Theatre, the intimate 170-seat Reynolds-Kirschbaum Recital Hall, and the black-box Odess Theatre. 

The ASC hosts a wide variety of events each year, in every field of artistic endeavor, from classical music, to jazz, to theatre and visual arts.  Jazz programming offered by the ASC has included Diane Schuur, Branford Marsalis, the Count Basie Orchestra, and the UAB SuperJazz Big Band.  Classical concerts have included Itzhak Perlman and major European orchestras.  The ASC is the official home of the Alabama Symphony Orchestra.  The ASC often collaborates with other local arts organizations, such as the Birmingham Music Club and the Alabama Jazz Hall of Fame to present concerts and educational programs, such as the Fun With Jazz Educational Program.

The Alys Stephens Center is also a venue for live recordings, including "Gospel Goes Classical," produced by UAB music professor Henry Panion, and "UAB SuperJazz, Featuring Ellis Marsalis," co-produced by Henry Panion and former UAB Director of Jazz Ensembles, Ray Reach.

See also 
 List of concert halls
 Alys Beach, Florida

External links 
http://www.alysstephens.org/

University of Alabama at Birmingham
University and college arts centers in the United States
Buildings and structures in Birmingham, Alabama
Tourist attractions in Birmingham, Alabama
Performing arts centers in Alabama
Stephens family